Pyrausta gazalis is a moth in the family Crambidae. It was described by George Hampson in 1913. It is found in Uganda and Zimbabwe.

References

Moths described in 1913
gazalis
Moths of Africa